was a town located in Tsukui District, Kanagawa Prefecture, Japan.

On March 20, 2006, Sagamiko, along with the town of Tsukui (also from Tsukui District), was merged into the expanded city of Sagamihara, and thus no longer exists as an independent municipality. It is now part of Midori-ku, Sagamihara.

Dissolved municipalities of Kanagawa Prefecture
Populated places disestablished in 2006
2006 disestablishments in Japan